Eubule spartocerana is a species of leaf-footed bug in the family Coreidae. It is found in South America.

References

 Brailovsky, H. (1992). "El género Eubule con descripción de cuatro especies y algunos registros nuevos (Hemiptera - Heteroptera - Coreidae - Spartocerini)". Anales del Instituto de Biología, Universidad Nacional Autónoma de México, Serie Zoología, vol. 63, no. 2, 201–213.
 Packauskas, Richard (2010). "Catalog of the Coreidae, or Leaf-Footed Bugs, of the New World". Fort Hays Studies, Fourth Series, no. 5, 270.
 Thomas J. Henry, Richard C. Froeschner. (1988). Catalog of the Heteroptera, True Bugs of Canada and the Continental United States. Brill Academic Publishers.

Further reading

 

Spartocerini